Ruth Esther Hadassah Schonthal (June 27, 1924 in Hamburg, Germany – July 10, 2006 in Scarsdale, New York, United States) was a pianist and composer.

Early years
Ruth Schonthal was born in Hamburg of Viennese parents. At the age of five she began composing and became the youngest student ever accepted at the Stern'sche Konservatorium in Berlin.  In 1935, Schonthal and her family were forced to leave Nazi Germany for Stockholm on account of her Jewish heritage. She later studied at the Royal Academy of Music (RAM) in Stockholm, where at the age of fourteen, she had her first sonatina published. At the RAM she studied composition with Ingemar Liljefors and piano with Olaf Wibergh. Then, she was once again forced to flee as a result of the rising political tension, and eventually traveled to a variety of places: first the USSR, then Japan, and then Mexico City, where at the age of 19 she gave a very widely acclaimed piano performance of her own compositions, including her First Piano Concerto, at the Palacio de Bellas Artes. Among the audience members was the noted German composer Paul Hindemith, who obtained a scholarship for her to study with him at Yale in 1946.  She was one of the few of Hindemith's students to graduate from the Conservatory with honors.

In 1950, Schonthal married the painter Paul Bernhard Seckel (b. 1918) and settled in New York City, eventually moving to New Rochelle, where she lived for most of her life.  One of her three sons is Al Seckel, an authority on visual illusions.

Schonthal received commissions for chamber music, operas, symphonic compositions, as well as works for organ and piano. She taught composition and music theory at NYU until 2006 when deteriorating health forced her to resign. She also taught composition and piano privately and was the first composition teacher of American composer Lowell Liebermann. One close student of hers, between 2003 and 2005, the unknown Stephanie Germanotta, went on to great fame in the pop music world as Lady Gaga. Schonthal used her music to support herself and her family throughout her life: she wrote for television and commercials, played the piano in various bars and clubs, and taught privately in New York.

Her works are widely performed in the US and abroad, but her music is perhaps most well known in her native Germany. Her music is published by Oxford University Press, Southern Music Co, Carl Fischer, G. E. Schirmer, Sisra Press, Fine Arts Music Co, Hildegard Music Publishing Co, nd Furore and recorded on LP on the Capriccio, Crystal, Leonarda, Opus One and Orion Labels, many of them reissued on CDs on the Leonarda and Cambria labels.

Musical compositions
"Her music is expressionist, her forms ingenious," writes Catherine Parsons Smith; like other Hindemith students she strove to break free of his influence (Grove Music Online). Her style is a fusion of several different techniques, both traditional and contemporary, and her compositions are meant to reflect the concerns of today's world (Composer's Bureau). Smith notes that being isolated from her composing contemporaries enabled her to distance herself from many contemporary trends of composition and allowed her to develop a compositional voice stemming from a classic-romantic heritage.  Her learning process, extending over several continents, certainly contributed to her diverse music as well.

Awards
In 1994 she received the Internationaler Kunstlerinnen Preis of the City of Heidelberg, and was honored with an exhibition of her life and works at the Prinz Carl am Kommarkt Museum there. In the United States, she received several Meet the Composer grants and ASCAP awards, and a Delta Omicron International award for her first string quartet. She received a Certificate of Merit from Yale for Outstanding Service to Music, and an Outstanding Musician Award from New York University.

Interviews
"Composer Interview: Ruth Schonthal," by Selma Epstein, Journal of the IAWM (International Alliance for Women in Music), February 1994, pp. 5–8.
Ruth Schonthal interview by Bruce Duffie

Selected works
Opera
The Courtship of Camilla (1979/80), A.A. Milne
Jocasta (1996/97), text by Hélène Cixous 
Princess Maleen (1988/89)

Orchestra
Concerto for Piano and Orchestra No.2 (1977)
Evening Music, Nocturnal Fantasy with Oceanwaves 
Music for Horn and Chamber Orchestra (1978)
The Beautiful Days of Aranjuez (1982, rev. 1983) 
Soundtrack for a Dark Street (1994) 
3 Celebrations "Happy Birthday Variations" for children's concerts 
The Young Dead Soldiers for choir and chamber orchestra (1987)

Chamber music
Duo for clarinet or viola and cello (2002)
Four Epiphanies for unaccompanied viola (1976)
Improvisation for solo cello (1994)
Sonata Concertante for cello or viola or clarinet and piano (1973)
String Quartet No.1 (1962)
String Quartet No.2 "in the Viennese Manner" (1983, revised 1996)
String Quartet No.3 "In memoriam Holocaust" (1997)
Tango for Two for clarinet and cello (2002)
Two Duets for violin and viola (2002)

Piano/Harpsichord 
The Canticles of Hieronymus (1986).  
Fiestas y Danzas (1961).   
Fourteen Inventions (1984). 
From the Life of a Pious Woman (1999).
Heidelberger Fanfare with Variations.  
In Homage of ... (24 Preludes).  
Japanese Sketches, Book I (Junior), Book II (Lower Intermediate), *Book III (Intermediate).
Nachklange (Reverberations) (1967–74) for piano with added timbres.  
Sonatensatz (1973), 
Sonata Breve (1973), 
Sonata quasi un 'Improvisazione' (1964).
Sonatina in A (1939). 
Three Elegies (1982).
Toccata and Arietta (1989)
65 Celebrations (1993/94)
Gestures (1978/79), eleven short piano pieces
Self-Portrait of the Artist as an Older Woman for piano (1991)
Variations in Search of a Theme for piano (1974)
Bird Calls (1981)
Educational piano music (collections, grade 1-2)
Miniatures, study and recital pieces for the Early Grades Vol.1, 2,3 for piano (grade 1-3). 
Potpourri/Minuscules for piano
Near and Far (Adult beginners)
Pentatonics for piano
From North and South of the Border

Organ
The Temptation of St. Anthony (1989/90)

Discography
Character Sketches
Solo Piano Works by 7 American Women by Gwyneth Walker, Judith Lang Zaimont, Tania Leon, Victoria Bond, and Jane Brockman (1995)

Sunbursts
Solo Piano Works by 7 American Women by Emma Lou Diemer, Dianne Goolkasian Rahbee, Vivian Adelberg Rudow, Ruth Schonthal, and Sheila Silver (1998)
Jewish String Quartets by Steven Doane, Abraham Wolf Binder, Darius Milhaud, Ruth Schonthal, and Sholom Secunda (2006)
Reverberations: Adina Mornell Plays Ruth Schonthal by Ruth Schonthal and Adina Mornell (2002)
Margaret Mills Plays Piano by Lowell Liebermann, Ruth Schonthal, and Margaret Mills (1994)
Vive la Différence: String Quartets by 5 Women from 3 Continents by Amy Marcy Cheney Beach, Priaulx Rainier, Sarah Aderholdt, Ruth Schonthal, and Lucie Vellere (1997)
Margaret Astrup Sings Ruth Schonthal by Schonthal and Astrup (2007)
Songs by Women by Elizabeth R. Austin, Elisenda Fábregas, Ruth Schonthal, Joyce Suskind, and Marcia Eckert (2003)

References

Bibliography
Smith, Catherine Parsons: ‘Schonthal, Ruth’ Grove Music Online ed. L. Macy (Accessed 23 April 2007)
(Author Unknown) "Ruth Schonthal: In Memoriam" SAI-National (3/2007)
C. Broda, The Piano Works of Ruth Schonthal diss.., Manhattan School of Music, 1991. 
Martina Helmig, Ruth Schonthal: A Compositional Development in Exile,   2007. (transl. from Ruth Schonthal: ein kompositorischer Werdegang im Exil (diss., Freie U., Berlin, 1993; Hildesheim, 1994)
Allan Kozinn, "Ruth Schonthal, a Composer of Eclectic Vision, Dies at 82." New York Times, July 19, 2006. 
Steve Luttmann, "Ruth Schonthal." Women and Music in America since 1900: an Encyclopedia. Edited by Kristin N Burns. Westport, CT, & London: Greenwood Press. 2002  vol.2, p. 594-596
Catherine Parsons Smith. "Schonthal, Ruth." Grove Music Online. Oxford Music Online. Oxford University Press.. Accessed  18 Mar. 2013. (print: ''New Grove Dictionary of Music and Musicians, 2nd ed., 2001. v.22 p. 614  )
Hanns-Werner Heister and Walter-Wolfgang Sparrer, "Komponisten der Gegenwart". edition text + kritik im Richard Boorberg Verlag GmbH & Co. KG, München 1992

External links
Ruth Schönthal interview, March, 1988
Biography on Vox Novus
 (Alec Chien, pianist)

1924 births
2006 deaths
20th-century classical composers
20th-century German composers
20th-century American women musicians
American classical composers
American women classical composers
American opera composers
Classical musicians from New York (state)
Women opera composers
Jewish emigrants from Nazi Germany to the United States
German women classical composers
German opera composers
Jewish American classical composers
Musicians from New Rochelle, New York
Musicians from Hamburg
Pupils of Paul Hindemith
20th-century women composers
20th-century German women musicians
20th-century American Jews
21st-century American Jews
21st-century American women